Juan Pablo Letelier Morel (born 7 January 1961) is a Chilean politician and economist who was a member of the Senate of Chile.

References

External links
 BCN Profile

1961 births
20th-century Chilean economists
21st-century Chilean economists
Socialist Party of Chile politicians
Georgetown University alumni
Senators of the LV Legislative Period of the National Congress of Chile
Living people
20th-century Chilean politicians
21st-century Chilean politicians
Members of the Chamber of Deputies of Chile